Eli Mencer (born November 14, 1996) is a professional gridiron football defensive lineman and linebacker for the Edmonton Elks of the Canadian Football League (CFL).

College career
After using a redshirt season in 2015, Mencer played college football for the Albany Great Danes as a linebacker from 2016 to 2019. He played in 45 games where he had 198 tackles, 21.5 sacks, two interceptions, 12 forced fumbles, and eight fumble recoveries.

Professional career

Seattle Seahawks
On April 25, 2020, Mencer signed with the Seattle Seahawks after going undrafted in the 2020 NFL Draft. He was released late in the preseason on August 29, 2020, to make room for Paul Richardson, who was also released one week later.

Montreal Alouettes
Mencer signed with the Montreal Alouettes on January 21, 2021. However, he was released prior to training camp in the pandemic-shortened 2021 CFL season, on June 21, 2021.

Toronto Argonauts
One day after his Montreal release, on June 22, 2021, Mencer was signed by the Toronto Argonauts. Following 2021 training camp, he was assigned to the practice roster, but made his professional debut in week 2, on August 13, 2021, against the Winnipeg Blue Bombers, where he had three special teams tackles. He recorded his first career interception on October 6, 2021, against the Ottawa Redblacks. He played in just six regular season games that year, but led the team in special teams tackles with 10.

To start the 2022 season, Mencer was on the injured list and then the practice roster before dressing as a backup linebacker in week three.

Personal life
Mencer was born to Lori Alderman and has three siblings, Reggie, Joey, and Jina.

References

External links
 Toronto Argonauts bio

1996 births
Living people
Albany Great Danes football players
American football defensive linemen
American football linebackers
American players of Canadian football
Canadian football defensive linemen
Canadian football linebackers
Montreal Alouettes players
Players of American football from Pennsylvania
Players of Canadian football from Pennsylvania
Seattle Seahawks players
Sportspeople from Altoona, Pennsylvania
Toronto Argonauts players